Julius Howard Miner (May 25, 1896 – March 13, 1963) was a United States district judge of the United States District Court for the Northern District of Illinois.

Education and career
Born on May 25, 1896, in Lubon, Russian Empire, Miner received a Bachelor of Laws from Chicago-Kent College of Law in 1917 and a Master of Laws from Northwestern University Pritzker School of Law in 1945. He was in private practice in Chicago, Illinois from 1917 to 1924, when he was appointed a Master in Chancery for the Circuit Court of Cook County. He served in that role until he became a Judge of that court in 1940; he served until his appointment to the federal bench. He was a Lecturer at the John Marshall Law School from 1938 to 1949 and began teaching as a lecturer at the Northwestern University Pritzker School of Law in 1945.

Notable writing
In 1946, he wrote a paper criticizing trial by jury in the United States.

Federal judicial service
Miner was nominated by President Dwight D. Eisenhower on January 23, 1958, to a seat on the United States District Court for the Northern District of Illinois vacated by Judge John P. Barnes. He was confirmed by the United States Senate on February 25, 1958, and received his commission on February 27, 1958. Miner served in that capacity until his death on March 13, 1963.

References

Sources
 

1896 births
1963 deaths
Illinois state court judges
Emigrants from the Russian Empire to the United States
Lawyers from Chicago
Judges of the United States District Court for the Northern District of Illinois
United States district court judges appointed by Dwight D. Eisenhower
20th-century American judges
Judges of the Circuit Court of Cook County (pre-1964 reorganization)